Young Bride is a 1932 American pre-Code drama film directed by William A. Seiter and written by Garrett Fort, Ralph Murphy and Jane Murfin. The film stars Helen Twelvetrees, Eric Linden, Arline Judge, Roscoe Ates and Polly Walters. The film was released on April 8, 1932, by RKO Pictures.

Cast
Helen Twelvetrees as Allie Smith Riggs
Polly Walters as Daisy
Eric Linden as Charlie Riggs
Arline Judge as Maisie
Roscoe Ates as Mike, the Pool Room Bartender
Blanche Friderici as Miss Margaret Gordon, the Librarian 
Cliff Edwards as Pete
Edwin Maxwell as The Doctor
Phyllis Crane as The Taxi Dancer
Edmund Breese as Mr. C. B. Chadwick, the Broker

References

External links
 

1932 films
1932 drama films
American black-and-white films
American drama films
1930s English-language films
Films directed by William A. Seiter
Films scored by Max Steiner
RKO Pictures films
Films with screenplays by Jane Murfin
Films with screenplays by Garrett Fort
1930s American films